James Travis Laster is an American corporate lawyer and judge who has served as a Vice Chancellor of the Delaware Court of Chancery since 2009.

Legal career
Laster graduated from Princeton University in 1991 and the University of Virginia School of Law in 1995. He clerked for Judge Jane Richards Roth on the United States Court of Appeals for the Third Circuit, before working in private practice at the Delaware law firm Richards, Layton & Finger. He founded a boutique law firm Abrams & Laster in 2005.

Judicial career
In 2009, Governor Jack Markell nominated Laster to the Delaware Court of Chancery. He was confirmed by the Delaware Senate on September 22 and sworn in on October 9 for a 12-year term as Vice Chancellor. He took over the seat formerly held by Stephen P. Lamb.

He was nominated for a second term by Governor John Carney, and the Delaware Senate confirmed his reappointment on October 13, 2021.

Notable cases
In Akorn Inc. v. Fresenius Kabi AG, a 2018 mergers and acquisitions case, Laster's ruling was the first time that the court ever allowed a buyer to terminate a merger agreement based on a "material adverse effect" contract provision. Laster found that Akorn's business "fell off a cliff" after signing the agreement, and in a "durationally significant" way. He distinguished the case from other cases involving buyers who had "second thoughts after cyclical trends or industrywide effects negatively impacted their own businesses". He concluded that Fresenius was not required to close the deal and had validly terminated it. The Delaware Supreme Court affirmed.

In a lawsuit about property taxes and school funding, Laster ruled in 2020 that all three Delaware counties' use of decades-old property values violated state law and the state constitution. The property tax system violated the state law requirement that property be assessed at "its true value in money", meaning fair market value, and the state constitution's requirement of uniform taxation. The litigation resulted in settlements, agreeing to property reassessments as well as school funding for certain disadvantaged students.

References

Vice Chancellors of Delaware
Delaware lawyers
Living people
Year of birth missing (living people)
Princeton University alumni
University of Virginia School of Law alumni